Gretna Green services is a motorway service station near the village of Gretna Green, Scotland and the town of Gretna. The service station is located next to the A74(M) motorway between junctions 21 and 22 and can be accessed by both northbound and southbound traffic. It is owned by Welcome Break.

References

Motorway service areas in Scotland
Welcome Break motorway service stations
Transport in Dumfries and Galloway